Romantic Warriors is the fifth studio album by German duo Modern Talking, released on 8 June 1987 by Hansa Records. It contains the single "Jet Airliner", which reached the top 10 in Germany and Austria, while entering the top 20 in Switzerland and Sweden. The album peaked at number three in Germany on 6 July 1987 and spent total of four weeks within the top 10.

Track listing

Personnel
 Dieter Bohlen – production, arrangements
 Luis Rodríguez – co-production
 Manfred Vormstein – art direction, concept, photos
 Tony Stone Associates – photos
 Didi Zill – photos

Chart

Certifications

References

1987 albums
Hansa Records albums
Modern Talking albums